Pomyków may refer to the following villages in Poland:
Pomyków, Łódź Voivodeship (central Poland)
Pomyków, Lublin Voivodeship (east Poland)
Pomyków, Świętokrzyskie Voivodeship (south-central Poland)
Pomyków, Masovian Voivodeship (east-central Poland)